Nasser Farbod (27 April 1922 – 26 April 2019) was an Iranian political activist and military officer who served as the Chief-of-Staff of the Islamic Republic of Iran Army from 27 March 1979 until his resignation on 12 July 1979.

He was a member of the National Front.

References

1922 births
2019 deaths
Islamic Republic of Iran Army major generals
National Front (Iran) politicians
Iran Party politicians
Non-U.S. alumni of the Command and General Staff College
Recipients of the Nishan-e-Quaid-i-Azam
Members of the Association for Defense of Freedom and the Sovereignty of the Iranian Nation